Grace Olive Reeve-Bilger (June 25, 1907 – October 1, 2000) was an American painter.
Often signing the name of g.Bilger (and later g.Stansbury) to her work. Bilger is mainly noted for her watercolor paintings of buildings, landscapes and structures, many of historical significance throughout the mid-west, USA.

Biography
Grace Reeve Bilger (g.Bilger and g. Stansbury) was a resident and artist in Olathe, Kansas from 1941 until 1999. She taught art at the Kansas State School For the Deaf for 25 years. In addition to meeting her requirements as a teacher, she studied art with the following; Dong Kingman, Don Stone, Eliot O’Hara, Frank Szaaz, Richard Yip, Zalton Szabo, Tony Van Hasselt, and Asertio Pascolini.  She traveled the world extensively and sketched in such places as Europe and Mexico as well as throughout the USA and Hawaii.

Bilger’s watercolor paintings have been reproduced along with her articles in the Ford Times, NEBRASKALand, and Kansas Magazine. She won a first prize in London, England for the design of a Christmas Card for the Heraldry Society. She also produced original historical murals which hung in the Johnson County Courthouse at Olathe . One of her works is in the permanent collection of the Sierra Museum of San Diego, California.

Bilger exhibited widely and her some of her works reside in collections in Europe, India, Philippines, and the U.S.A. She also had exhibited shows which include but is not limited to: the Kansas City area, Heritage, Discovery, Plaza, Ward Parkway, Oak Park, Crown Center, Prairie Village, Kansas, and Metcalf South.

In 1979 one of her watercolors was selected to be in the exhibition of Eastern Kansas Artists in the Rotunda of the Kansas State Capitol in Topeka, Kansas . She was a member of the International Society of Artists (Artists' International Association), the Greater Kansas City Art Association, and Tri-County Art League. "Grace Bilger" day was established June 25, 2007 in Olathe, Kansas to commemorate Olathe's 150th birthday and Grace's contributions artistically and historically to the city and county.

Grace Reeve Bilger is survived by her daughter Sarah, granddaughter Suzanna Reeves, two grandchildren, and four great-grandchildren.

References
 Biography adapted (by her family) from her biography in "The Olathe Rotary Club: Honors Its 1994 Paul Harris Fellows"
 Olathe Daily News,"Artist Pictures Olathe's Past", Wednesday, March 25, 1987.
 Olathe Daily News,"Local artist still paints with grace after 91 years", August 31, 1998, page 1 & 6A.
 NEBRASKALand, August 1966, pages 25–31, "Many Faces of Nebraska"
 Kansas!, No. 3, 1964, (center-fold painting displayed)
 The Kansas City Star, August 24, 1972, page 6W, "Teacher Reflects on Career."
 City of Olathe, Kansas, Olathe History:1870 through the Present, retrieved March 1, 2009 from olatheks.org

External links
 Official Grace Bilger Website
 June 25, 2007 Established "Grace Bilger" Day
 Olathe, Kansas History

1907 births
2000 deaths
Artists from Nebraska
American women painters
Artists from Kansas
American watercolorists
20th-century American women artists
20th-century American painters
Women watercolorists